The following elections were held in the year 1804.

North America

United States
 1804 New York gubernatorial election
 United States House of Representatives elections in New York, 1804
 1804 and 1805 United States House of Representatives elections
 1804 United States presidential election
 1804 and 1805 United States Senate elections
 United States Senate special election in New York, November 1804
 United States Senate special elections in New York, February 1804

See also
 :Category:1804 elections

1804
Elections